The French martini is a vodka-based cocktail. It was invented in the 1980s at one of Keith McNally's New York City bars. It next appeared on the drinks menu at McNally's Balthazar in SoHo in 1996. The cocktail was produced during the 1980s–1990s cocktail renaissance.

It is not a true martini, but is one of many  drinks that incorporate the term martini into their names. The key ingredient that makes a martini "French" is Chambord, a black raspberry liqueur that has been produced in France since 1685.

See also
 List of cocktails

References

External links
 

Cocktails with vodka